The Scandelion Castle was built by the Crusaders in Lebanon in 1116, during the reign of Baldwin I of Jerusalem, other sources indicate that they took the city of Iskandarouna, or Scandelion, in 1124. It became a strategic high ground, used to defend Tyre.

References

Castles in Lebanon